John Launois (born Jean René Launois; November 23, 1928 – May 5, 2002) was a noted international photojournalist. His work appeared in Life (magazine), The Saturday Evening Post, National Geographic (magazine), Fortune (magazine), Time (magazine), Newsweek, Look, Rolling Stone, Paris Match, The Sunday Times, and other American, European, and Asian publications.

Born Jean René Launois in Marly-le-Roi, France to Marguerite and Paul Launois, he was the oldest of six children and grew up during the Nazi occupation. During his youth, he found work in Paris as a photographer’s assistant until he was drafted into the French army. After being discharged, he earned enough money to travel to America in order to pursue his dream of becoming a photojournalist. He served two years as a military photographer in the U.S. Army and became an American citizen in 1954.

Represented by the Black Star photo agency in New York, Launois took many notable images of the 1950s, 60s and 70s, including life behind the Iron Curtain for Life magazine, the discovery of a modern day Stone Age tribe for National Geographic, human rights activist Malcolm X in Cairo, Egypt during his final pilgrimage, as well as the rise of rock stars such as the Beatles and Bob Dylan for the Saturday Evening Post, among others.

His life and work are the subject of the book “L’Americain: A Photojournalist’s Life.”

References

Further reading 
 Black Star: 60 Years of Photojournalism (English, German and French Edition) by Hendrik Neubauer
 National Geographic The Covers: Iconic Photographs, Unforgettable Stories by Mark Collins Jenkins and Chris Johns
 Through the Lens: National Geographic's Greatest Photographs by National Geographic by National Geographic and Leah Bendavid-Val
 Truth Needs No Ally: Inside Photojournalism by Howard Chapnick
 Black Star: The Ryerson University Historical Print Collection of the Black Star Publishing Company : Portfolio Selection and Chronicle of a New York Photo Agency Michael Torosian

External links
 John Launois: 1960s images from the Beatles to Malcolm X
 Famed Photographer John Launois Is Subject of Exhibit and Book Rap

1928 births
2002 deaths
French photojournalists
National Geographic photographers